Grosses-Roches is a municipality in Quebec, Canada.

Demographics

See also
 List of municipalities in Quebec

References

Incorporated places in Bas-Saint-Laurent
Municipalities in Quebec